Ernst Wiechert (18 May 1887 – 24 August 1950) was a German teacher, poet and writer.

Biography

Wiechert was born in the village of Kleinort, East Prussia, (now Piersławek, Poland).

He was one of the most widely read novelists in Germany during the 1930s. He incorporated his humanist ideals in his novels among which Das einfache Leben  (The simple Life, 1939) and Die Jeromin-Kinder  (The Jeromin children, 1945/47) are the best known today.

Wiechert was strongly opposed to Nazism from the start. He appealed in 1933 and 1935 to the undergraduates in Munich to retain their critical thinking in relation to the national socialist ideology. This was rated as call to internal resistance. The minutes of the speech circulated illegally in Germany and reached Moscow in 1937 baked in bread. Here it was published in the influential exile magazine Das Wort (The Word). But Wiechert went even further and dared to openly criticize the imprisonment of Martin Niemöller by the Nazis in 1938. He was arrested shortly after the rigged plebiscite by which Germany absorbed Austria in April 1938.

In consequence of his criticism, he was interned in the Buchenwald concentration camp for four months. He wrote down his memories about his imprisonment and buried the manuscript; it was published in 1945 as  Der Totenwald (Forest of the dead).

After the war, Wiechert was a critic of West German society. In 1948, he settled in Stäfa, Switzerland, where he died in August 1950 of cancer. He was buried in Stäfa.

Works
 Die Flucht, novel, (pseudonym: Ernst Barany Bjell), 1916
 Der Wald, novel, 1922
 Der Totenwolf, novel, 1924
 Die blauen Schwingen, novel, 1925
 Der Knecht Gottes Andreas Nyland, novel, 1926 
 Der silberne Wagen, short stories, 1928
 Die kleine Passion. Geschichte eines Kindes, novel, 1929
 Die Flöte des Pan, short stories, 1930
 Jedermann, novel, 1931
 Die Magd des Jürgen Doskocil, 1932
 Geschichte eines Knaben, novel, 1933
 Das Spiel vom deutschen Bettelmann, radio play, 1933
 Die Majorin, novel, 1934
 Der Todeskandidat, short stories, 1934
 Der verlorene Sohn, play, 1935
 Die goldene Stadt, play, 1935
 Hirtennovelle, short stories, 1935
 Wälder und Menschen, childhood memoirs, 1936 
 Das heilige Jahr, short stories, 1936
 Von den treuen Begleitern, interpretations of poems, 1938
 Atli, der Bestmann, short stories, 1938
 Das einfache Leben, novel, 1939, 
 Die Jeromin-Kinder, novel, 1945/7, 
 Die Totenmesse, short story, 1945/7
 Der brennende Dornbusch, short story, 1945
 Demetrius, short story, 1945
 Der Totenwald, Report from the concentration camp Buchenwald, 1946 (written in 1937) 
 Märchen 1946/7
 Der weiße Büffel oder Von der großen Gerechtigkeit, 1946 (written in 1937)
 Der armen Kinder Weihnachten, play, 1946
 Okay oder die Unsterblichen, play, 1946
 Die Gebärde, short stories, 1947
 Der Richter, short story, 1948
 Jahre und Zeiten, memoirs, 1949, 
 Die Mutter, short stories, 1948
 Missa sine Nomine, novel 1950
 Der Exote, novel, 1951
 Die letzten Lieder, poems, 1951
 Es geht ein Pflüger übers Land, short stories chosen by Lilje Wiechert, 1951
 Häftling Nr. 7188, diary entries and letters, 1966
   Vom Trost der Welt, 1938

References

Bibliography

 Hans Ebeling: Ernst Wiechert. Das Werk des Dichters. Berlin 1937.
 Carol Petersen: Ernst Wiechert. Mensch der Stille. Hamburg: Hansischer Gildenverl. 1947. (= Dichter der Gegenwart; 1)
 Diverse Autoren: Ernst Wiechert. Der Mensch und sein Werk. Eine Anthologie. München: Verl. Kurt Desch. 1951. 
 Helmut Ollesch: Ernst Wiechert. 2. Aufl. Wuppertal-Barmen: Müller 1956. (= Dichtung und Deutung; 3)
 Guido Reiner: Ernst-Wiechert-Bibliographie 1916 – 1971, 1. Teil. Paris 1972.
 Jürgen Fangmeier: Ernst Wiechert. Ein theologisches Gespräch mit dem Dichter. Zürich: Theologischer Verl. 1976. (= Theologische Studien; 117)  
 Jörg Hattwig: Das Dritte Reich im Werk Ernst Wiecherts. Geschichtsdenken, Selbstverständnis und literarische Praxis. Frankfurt am Main u.a.: Lang 1984. (= Europäische Hochschulschriften; Reihe 1, Deutsche Sprache und Literatur; 739) 
 Hugh Alexander Boag: Ernst Wiechert: The Prose Works in Relation to his Life and Times. Stuttgart 1987. (= Stuttgarter Arbeiten zur Germanistik 130)
 William Niven :Ernst Wiechert and his Role between 1933 and 1945. (PDF, 126KB), New German Studies, 16 (1990), 1-20.
 Ernst Wiechert heute, hrsg. v. Guido Reiner u. Klaus Weigelt. Frankfurt am Main: R. G. Fischer, 1993. (= Schriften der Internationalen Ernst-Wiechert-Gesellschaft; 1)  
 Jurgita Katauskien·e: Land und Volk der Litauer im Werk deutscher Schriftsteller des 19./20. Jahrhunderts (H. Sudermann, E. Wiechert, A. Miegel und J. Bobrowski). Vilnius: Verl. Matrica 1997. 
 Annette Schmollinger: "Intra muros et extra". Deutsche Literatur im Exil und in der inneren Emigration. Ein exemplarischer Vergleich. Heidelberg: Winter 1999. (= Beiträge zur neueren Literaturgeschichte; F. 3, Bd. 161) 
 Zuspruch und Tröstung. Beiträge über Ernst Wiechert und sein Werk. Zum zehnjährigen Bestehen der Internationalen Ernst-Wiechert-Gesellschaft (IEWG), hrsg. v. Hans-Martin Plesske u. Klaus Weigelt. Frankfurt/Main: R. G. Fischer, 1999. (= Schriften der Internationalen Ernst-Wiechert-Gesellschaft; 2) 
 Franz H. Schrage: Weimar - Buchenwald. Spuren nationalsozialistischer Vernichtungsgewalt in Werken von Ernst Wiechert, Eugen Kogon, Jorge Semprun. Düsseldorf: Grupello-Verl. 1999. 
 Von bleibenden Dingen. Über Ernst Wiechert und sein Werk, hrsg. v. Bärbel Beutner u. Hans-Martin Pleßke. Frankfurt am Main: R. G. Fischer, 2002. (= Schriften der Internationalen Ernst-Wiechert-Gesellschaft; 3) 
 Manfred Franke:  Köln: SH-Verl. 2003.

External links
 Wiechert and his role between 1933 and 1945

1887 births
1950 deaths
People from Mrągowo County
People from East Prussia
German resistance members
Buchenwald concentration camp survivors
People from Stäfa
German male novelists
20th-century German novelists
20th-century German male writers